Jean-Baptiste Nouvion (30 September 1833 – 1 August 1898) was a French prefect and a colonial administrator in Algeria. He made the success of the French aperitif Sirop de Picon.

Career 
He started his career as chief of staff of the Civil governor of Algeria, Gustave Mercier Lacombe from 1859 to 1861. After several positions as sub prefect in Saint Nazaire and Philippeville, he became the prefect of Oran in Algeria from 1873 until 1879.

The prefect Nouvion and the aperitif Sirop de Picon 
In 1862 the French government invited industry to take part in the Universal Exhibition in London. Jean-Baptiste Nouvion, the sub-prefect of Philippeville, urged Gaëtan Picon to bring his aperitif Sirop de Picon to the exhibition. But, failing to convince the manufacturer to take part, the sub-prefect stubbornly took it upon himself (without telling Mr. Picon) to ship a case of African Amer to London. The product ended up crowned with a bronze medal in the bitter aperitif category, greatly adding to Gaëtan Picon's eventual fortune.

Honours
A city near Oran was named Nouvion as a recognition of his work. After the Independence of Algeria, the name of the city was changed to El Ghomri.

France: Officier of the  Legion of Honour by the emperor Napoléon III in 1865
Spain: Commandeur of the Order of Isabella the Catholic 
Tunisia: Grand officier of the  Order of Glory (Tunisia)

References

External links

1833 births
1898 deaths
People from Algiers
Officiers of the Légion d'honneur
Chassériau family
Prefects of France